Sir James Patrick O'Collins  (31 March 1892 − 25 November 1983), an Australian suffragan bishop, was the fifth Bishop of the Roman Catholic Diocese of Ballarat, serving for over 29 years.

He was appointed as bishop of Geraldton in Western Australia on 11 February 1930. On 23 December 1941 he was appointed as bishop of Ballarat and returned to Victoria. O'Collins retired on 1 May 1971 and was appointed as Bishop Emeritus of Ballarat.

He was appointed a Knight Commander of the Order of the British Empire (KBE) in 1980 for services to religion and the community.

The Royal Commission into Institutional Responses to Child Sexual Abuse found that O'Collins had received a complaint in the 1960s that Father Gerald Ridsdale had sexually abused a boy but did not take action.

See also

Roman Catholic Church in Australia

References 

1892 births
1983 deaths
Clergy from Melbourne
Australian people of Irish descent
Roman Catholic bishops of Ballarat
Australian Knights Commander of the Order of the British Empire
Catholic Church sexual abuse scandals in Australia
20th-century Roman Catholic bishops in Australia
Ecclesiastical passivity to Catholic sexual abuse cases
Roman Catholic bishops of Geraldton
People from Port Melbourne